This is a list of the General Dynamics F-111 aircraft operated by the Royal Australian Air Force (RAAF) between 1973 and 2010. The RAAF's fleet of F-111s included 28 F-111Cs (of which four were converted to RF-111C reconnaissance aircraft) and 15 F-111Gs. Several more F-111s were purchased from the United States and used for ground training and testing purposes, or as a source of spare parts.

Background
The Australian Government purchased 24 F-111Cs in 1963. These were completed during 1968 and early 1969, and the first of the RAAF's aircraft was handed over to the service on 4 September 1968. However, the entire fleet was grounded in the United States shortly afterwards while serious deficiencies with the F-111's design were corrected. The RAAF finally accepted the 24 aircraft during 1973, and they flew to Australia in four groups between 1 June and 4 December that year.

Four of the F-111Cs were modified to RF-111C reconnaissance aircraft. The first, A8-126, received these modifications in the United States between October 1979 and April 1979; the other three were converted in Australia between July and September 1980.

The RAAF purchased four ex-United States Air Force (USAF) F-111As in 1981 as attrition replacements. These aircraft were delivered to the service in 1982 and were subsequently converted to F-111C standard.

In 1992 the Australian Government decided to purchase up to 18 ex-USAF F-111Gs in order to extend the type's service life. 15 F-111Gs were eventually acquired, and they were delivered to the RAAF during late 1993 and early 1994. Three more ex-USAF F-111Gs were also held for Australia in the United States, but never delivered. Other ex-USAF F-111s were also held at the 309th Aerospace Maintenance and Regeneration Group (AKA The Boneyard) in Arizona as sources of spare parts for the RAAFs fleet of aircraft.

The Australian Government announced on 7 November 2003 that the RAAF's F-111s would be retired from 2010, and on 16 March 2007 it was announced that the type would be withdrawn by the end of 2010. The F-111Gs were retired before the F-111Cs, with the last leaving service on 3 September 2007. The F-111C fleet was drawn down, and the type was finally retired on 3 December 2010. Eight of the RAAF's F-111s (seven F-111Cs and one F-111G) were destroyed in crashes during the type's service, with ten airmen being killed.

Following the F-111s' retirement, 13 of the surviving aircraft (12 F-111Cs and a single F-111G) were preserved in aviation museums and RAAF air bases. The remaining aircraft were buried at the Swanbank landfill site outside of Ipswich, Queensland, between 21 and 23 November 2011.

Aircraft

See also
List of aircraft of the Royal Australian Air Force

References

Citations

Works consulted

Australian military aircraft
Australia General Dynamics F-111 Aircraft